Patrick Tardieu (born 9 June 1968) is a Haitian former professional footballer who played as a forward.

Career
The younger brother of author Jerry, Tardieu signed for Haitian club Violette at the age of 16 before going to live with his diplomat uncle in Belgium, where he played for a lower league team. 

For 1996, he signed for American top flight side New England Revolution, becoming the first Haitian to play in the newly-formed Major League Soccer. From thee, Tardieu almost sealed a move to Argentinean top flight team San Lorenzo de Almagro but was unable to join because they filled their foreign player quota. After that, while captaining the Haiti national team, he played for Cape Cod Crusaders, Florida Strikers, Miami Breakers and Atlanta Silverbacks in the American lower leagues. 

Following retirement, he established a business to help Haitian players ply their trade abroad.

References

External links
 Patrick Tardieu at SoccerStats.us

Living people
1968 births
Haitian footballers
Association football forwards
Haiti international footballers
Violette AC players
Fort Lauderdale Strikers players
New England Revolution players
Cape Cod Crusaders players
Florida Strikers players
Atlanta Silverbacks players
Major League Soccer players